Sid Lawrence  (born 16 March 1909) was a Welsh international footballer. He was part of the Wales national football team between 1931 and 1935, playing 8 matches. He played his first match on 5 December 1931 against Ireland and his last match on 5 October 1935 against Scotland.

See also
 List of Wales international footballers (alphabetical)

References

1909 births
Welsh footballers
Wales international footballers
Swansea City A.F.C. players
Swindon Town F.C. players
Place of birth missing
Date of death missing
Association footballers not categorized by position